The 1938 Cornell Big Red football team was an American football team that represented Cornell University during the 1938 college football season.  In their third season under head coach Carl Snavely, the Big Red compiled a 5–1–1 record and outscored their opponents by a combined total of 110 to 55.

Schedule

References

Cornell
Cornell Big Red football seasons
Cornell Big Red football